Chetan Anand (born 20 November 1991) is an Indian politician from the state of Bihar. He is elected as a Member of Legislative Assembly (MLA) from Sheohar constituency representing the Rashtriya Janata Dal (RJD) in the 2020 election to the Bihar Legislative Assembly.

Early life 
Alumni of Welham Boys' School
Chetan Anand is the son of Anand Mohan Singh, a former Member of Parliament (MP) and an MLA, and Lovely Anand, who is also a former MP.

Political career 
Anand started his official political career with Jitan Ram Manjhi's Party Hindustani Awam Morcha as National president of party's student wing in 2015. He along with his mother Lovely Anand, joined RJD in late September 2020 ahead of 2020 Bihar Legislative Assembly election. He contested the Sheohar constituency and won as the MLA. He has been campaigning for the release of his father, Anand Mohan, who was convicted of abetting murder. There were reports of him pledging his salary for public help during COVID-19 lockdown in India.

References 

Living people
Rashtriya Janata Dal politicians
Bihar MLAs 2020–2025
1991 births
People from Sheohar district